This is a list of recordings by the Spanish tenor Alfredo Kraus.


Listing by role

References
Notes

Sources
 170 recordings in which Alfredo Kraus appears, 

Kraus, Alfredo